The Tulsa Open was a golf tournament on the Ben Hogan Tour. It ran from 1991 to 1992. It was played at The Golf Club of Oklahoma in Broken Arrow, Oklahoma.

In 1992 the winner earned $30,000.

Winners

Former Korn Ferry Tour events
Golf in Oklahoma
Sports in Tulsa, Oklahoma
Recurring sporting events established in 1991
Recurring sporting events disestablished in 1992
1991 establishments in Oklahoma
1992 disestablishments in Oklahoma